Estadio Municipal Verónica Boquete de San Lázaro, formerly called Estadio Multiusos de San Lázaro, is a multipurpose stadium in Santiago de Compostela, Spain. It is used mostly for football matches and is the home ground of SD Compostela.

Facilities
Situated in the eastern suburb of San Lázaro, the stadium is a multipurpose arena, used primarily for the football matches. The stadium is oval and has a terracotta-coloured roof that rises on the west side to incorporate the director's seating and press facilities on a second tier. The pitch is surrounded by a 400 m athletics track, which is relatively uncommon in Spanish stadiums. The majority of the 16,666 seats are incorporated on a single, covered tier.

History
The inaugural match took place on 24 June 1993, when a four-way tournament was staged, featuring Deportivo de La Coruña, CD Tenerife, CA River Plate and São Paulo FC. Deportivo and River Plate played in the first match and Bebeto had the honour of scoring the first goal.

On 8 November 2018, the stadium was renamed to pay homage to Vero Boquete, Spanish footballer.

References

External links 
 SD Compostela Official Website 
 Estadios de España 

Football venues in Galicia (Spain)
Multi-purpose stadiums in Spain
Buildings and structures in Santiago de Compostela
SD Compostela
Sports venues completed in 1993
Sport in Santiago de Compostela